The 1935 Colgate Red Raiders football team was an American football team that represented Colgate University as an independent during the 1935 college football season. In its fifth season under head coach Andrew Kerr, the team compiled a 7–3 record, shut out seven of ten opponents, and outscored all opponents by a total of 224 to 29. Charles Wasicek was the team captain. 

On October 5, 1935, Colgate played a unique "triangular" match against St. Lawrence and Amherst. Each team played 30 minutes against the other two teams. Colgate won both of its games.

The team played its home games on Whitnall Field in Hamilton, New York.

Schedule

References

Colgate
Colgate Raiders football seasons
Colgate Red Raiders football